The Finland Billie Jean King Cup team represents Finland in Billie Jean King Cup tennis competition and are governed by the Suomen Tennisliitto.  They currently compete in the Europe/Africa Zone of Group II, having missed out on promotion to group I for 2016.

History
Finland competed in its first Fed Cup in 1968.  Their best result was reaching the quarterfinals in 1993.

See also
Fed Cup
Finland Davis Cup team

External links

Billie Jean King Cup teams
Fed Cup
Fed Cup